Victor Kenneth Klever (born July 10, 1959) is a former American football tight end in the National Football League (NFL). He was drafted by the New York Jets in the ninth round of the 1982 NFL Draft and played his entire career with them. He played college football at Montana.

References

1959 births
Living people
Players of American football from Portland, Oregon
American football running backs
American football tight ends
Montana Grizzlies football players
New York Jets players